Ratris Khel Chale 3 is an Indian Marathi supernatural television series which aired on Zee Marathi. It premiered from 22 March 2021 and is a sequel to Ratris Khel Chale.

Series

Plot 
15 years after Neelima's usurpation of the Naik property, Mai has grown old and works as a maid at Agent Salgaonkar's house, and Datta works as a servant to the farmer. Madhav is in trauma due to Neelima's act and Archis' suicide, and becomes mentally unstable and troubled by the villagers. Abhiram has settled in Bangalore with his second wife, Kaveri, after divorcing Devika. Sushma is rich and wants to sell the Naik Wada, which is in bad condition and is possessed by Anna's ghost, Shevanta and the people killed by Anna.
 
A builder from Mumbai named Parulekar comes to Anna's wada to buy it. Anna serves him dinner and alcohol. However, when Salgaonkar wakes him up in the morning, the palace-like wada has been ruined, and Parulekar flees to Mumbai in panic. A police officer, Sayaji, threatens Salgaonkar to sell Anna's wada. Sushma returns to the wada to sell it, but attacks Mai when he sees her in front of the wada. Mai writes a letter to Abhiram, who decides to go to meet her.

Sayaji and his wife, Sushlya, want to sell the wada, but Mai is not ready to sign away her legal rights. Sushlya goes to the wada and forcibly takes Mai's thumbprint, while Abhiram arrives at the wada with his wife, Kaveri. Abhiram introduces Kaveri to Mai and seeks her blessings. He decides to renovate the wada and gives the contract to Salgaonkar to renovate it. Shevanta's ghost possesses Kaveri and she falls sick. Meanwhile, Devika's parents arrive at the wada and in a great misunderstanding, curse Abhiram for having abandoned Devika, saying that she is following in her father's footsteps of infidelity and adultery. Salgaonkar offers to take Abhiram to meet a godman named Raghunath Maharaj, who turns out to be Raghu Gurav, the old evil priest of the Naik family.

Abhiram is shocked when he learns that Chhaya is married to Raghu and is an equal shareholder in Raghu's scheme, and she reprimands Abhiram for neglecting her in her tough times. After a few days, the wada is rebuilt as before and Mai is happy. Kaveri decides to return to Bangalore and Abhiram prepares to go as well, but the two extend their stay due to her illness. On the way to a medical store, Abhiram meets Datta who is now a thief and he asks for money. Kaveri is frequently possessed by Shevanta's spirit and searches for Anna. Sarita learns about the wada's renovation and returns to claim her rights over the property forcibly, but a possessed Kaveri threatens her and throws her out.

Chhaya Sarita, whom Sushlya supports, enters Naik Wada and claims the property. Anna, who was supposed to possess Abhiram, possesses Sayajirao and Shevanta instead. She berates Sayaji for cheating on her. Sushlya, Chhaya, and Sarita try to sell the wada but Abhiram stops the agreement. Purva is married to a mentally-disabled person and her father-in-law who has bad sight asks Datta for money. Her husband and father-in-law are killed by Anna and Shevanta's ghosts. During the Ganpati festival, Datta is arrested for fraud, but is released at Kaveri's insistence. Later that day, Sushma and Sayaji move into Naik Wada. Kaveri and Sayaji are threatened by Anna, Sheventa and the other villagers' ghosts.

Madhav sees Kaveri and Sayaji who are possessed and misunderstands them. Mai swears an oath on Madhav's well-being which is later fulfilled by Kaveri. For selling the wada, the Naiks and Sushma search for Anna's will, which is taken by Sushma and Sarita. During Abhiram and Kaveri's wedding anniversary, a possessed Kaveri and Sayaji hug each other. Abhiram sees this and mistakenly assumes them having an affair. The Naiks oust Kaveri from the wada, and Sushma leaves with Sayaji.

Abhiram is misled by Anna and Shevanta's act. Sarita, Chhaya, and Raghu aggravate the situation while Datta and Purva take Kaveri's side. Mai is tricked and ousts Kaveri, but she returns, possessed by Sheventa. When Kaveri attacks Mai, she senses an evil force in Kaveri and tries to help her to fix her relationship with Abhiram. Mai asks Raghu to perform some rituals to drive away evil forces from Kaveri and the wada. Shevanta and Anna learn of the plan and torture him. In the meantime, Raghu and Chhaya's scheme is revealed to the villagers. He hides in the secret dungeon behind the Naik wada and is killed by the ghosts. Kaveri's positive attitude forces Abhiram to change his decision and accept Kaveri again. When Kaveri possesses Shevanta and tries to kill Raghu, Mai confronts Sheventa and challenges her to free her spirit and save her family from her evil clutches.

When Shevanta tries to kill the Naiks, Mai empties the wada to save them. Only Kaveri, who is possessed by Shevanta, stays in the wada awaiting her reunion with Sayaji. Sushma and the Naiks learn about the ghosts and their possession. When Mai consults a guruji, he refers her to a sorceress, Vachchhi. Vachchhi gains Mai's trust, enters the wada and tries to deal with Anna and Shevanta. Anna and Shevanta make a deal with Vachchhi to leave the possessed bodies and the wada with a condition of their marriage. She also asks the ghosts to heal a mentally unstable Madhav. When the Naiks return to the wada, they oust Vachchhi and free a possessed Kaveri and Sayaji from her holy circle. Anna and Shevanta decide to kill all the Naiks and live in the wada alone.

Vachchhi uses her powers and controls Madhav to make him her disciple. They control the ghosts and promise their marriage. With an ongoing wedding in the village, Anna and Shevanta decide to marry. Vachchhi asks Sushlya and Sayaji to stay back in the wada to control the spirit's actions. When Vachchhi delays the wedding, Anna and Shevanta try to kill Sarita and Kaveri. To save the Naiks, Vachchhi promises to marry the ghosts on Anna's tith and the forthcoming eclipse night. Indu gets furious at Vachchhi's actions. On the wedding night, she successfully breaks the wedding for which the ghosts become angered and decide to take revenge against the Naiks. Sayaji and Kaveri learn the truth and are haunted by the ghosts.

Cast

Main 
 Madhav Abhyankar as Hari Naik (Anna)
 Shakuntala Nare as Indumati Hari Naik (Mai)
 Apurva Nemlekar as Kumudini Kamalakar Patankar (Shevanta)
 Krutika Tulaskar replaced Apurva as Shevanta

Recurring 
 Sainkeet Kamat as Abhiram Hari Naik
 Bhagya Nair as Kaveri Abhiram Naik
 Pooja Gore as Purva Dattaram Naik
 Mangesh Salvi as Madhav Hari Naik
 Pralhad Kudtarkar as Pandu
 Suhas Shirsat as Dattaram Hari Naik (Datta)
 Prajakta Wadaye as Sarita Dattaram Naik
 Purniema Dey-Demanna as Sushma Hari Naik (Sushlya)
 Mahesh Phalke as Inspector Sayaji, Sushma's husband
 Anil Gawade as Raghunath Maharaj / Raghunath "Raghu" Gurav
 Namrata Pawaskar as Chhaya Maa / Chhaya Hari Naik
 Suraj Patki as Purva's husband
 Sanjeevani Patil as Vatsala Aaba Naik (Vachchhi).
 Ganesh Jadhav as Vinay

Production

Development 
On 14 February 2021, Zee Marathi and the production house confirmed the production of Ratris Khel Chale 3.

Casting 
Madhav Abhyankar returned as Anna Naik. Apurva Nemlekar returned as Shevanta. Shakuntala Nare, Mangesh Salvi, Sainkeet Kamat, Anil Gawde, Suhas Shirsat, Prajakta Wadaye and Namrata Pawaskar reprised their roles as Indumati, Madhav, Abhiram, Raghunath Gurav, Dattaram, Sarita and Chhaya, respectively, while Purniema Dey was offered the role of Sushma Naik who was previously played by Rutuja Dharmadhikari. Bhagya Nair selected for the role of Kaveri who speaks Malayalam language. In November 2021, Nemlekar quit the series, calling out bullying by co-actors and a dispute with the channel as the reasons.

Location 
The series was filmed in Konkan. The production and filming again took place in that Naik's wada. The production and filming of the series then took place in Akeri, Maharashtra.

Filming 
Filming started in February 2021 in the same Naik Wada in Akeri, Maharashtra. On 13 April, Chief minister of Maharashtra Uddhav Thackeray announced a lockdown due to the rise of COVID-19 cases in Maharashtra, which halted filming. In late July 2021, writer and actor Pralhad Kudtarkar confirmed the return of the series. On 8 August 2021, an official promo was released of Shevanta (Apurva Nemlekar) indicating the show's return on 16 August 2021.

Special episode (1 hour)
 26 December 2021

Awards

References

External links 
 Ratris Khel Chale 3 at ZEE5
 

Marathi-language television shows
2020s supernatural television series
Zee Marathi original programming
2021 Indian television series debuts
2022 Indian television series endings